Lázaro Arístides Betancourt Mella (born 30 July 1936) is a Cuban former hurdler who competed in the 1964 Summer Olympics. He was third in the 1963 Pan American Games 110 metres Hurdles. In the 1959 Pan American Games 110 metres hurdles he finished fifth.

References

1936 births
Living people
Cuban male hurdlers
Olympic athletes of Cuba
Athletes (track and field) at the 1964 Summer Olympics
Athletes (track and field) at the 1959 Pan American Games
Athletes (track and field) at the 1963 Pan American Games
Pan American Games bronze medalists for Cuba
Pan American Games medalists in athletics (track and field)
Central American and Caribbean Games gold medalists for Cuba
Competitors at the 1962 Central American and Caribbean Games
Central American and Caribbean Games medalists in athletics
Medalists at the 1963 Pan American Games
20th-century Cuban people